Stefan Arnaz McClure (born January 31, 1993) is an American football coach and former strong safety who is currently the corner backs coach at Southern Methodist University (SMU). He played college football at the University of California, Berkeley, and signed with the Indianapolis Colts as an undrafted free agent in 2016.

Professional career

Indianapolis Colts
McClure signed with the Indianapolis Colts as an undrafted free agent after not being selected in the 2016 NFL Draft on May 2, 2016. He was waived on September 3, 2016 for final roster cuts. The Colts signed McClure to their practice squad on December 7, 2016. On January 2, 2017, McClure signed a futures contract with the team, but was waived on May 1, 2017.

Washington Redskins
On August 3, 2017, McClure signed with the Washington Redskins. Despite being a late addition in the offseason, he had a strong preseason and made the final roster. He played in seven games, primarily on special teams, before suffering a hamstring injury in Week 8. He was placed on injured reserve on November 1, 2017. He was released with an injury settlement on November 8, 2017.

Detroit Lions
On November 27, 2017, McClure was signed to the Detroit Lions' practice squad. He was released on December 5, 2017.

Oakland Raiders
On December 19, 2017, McClure was signed to the Oakland Raiders' practice squad.

Detroit Lions (second stint)
On January 2, 2018, McClure signed a reserve/future contract with the Lions. He was waived/injured on August 19, 2018 and was placed on injured reserve. He was released on August 25, 2018.

Coaching career

SMU
Stefan began coaching in 2019 as a defensive graduate assistant under his former head coach Sonny Dykes at SMU. In March of 2021 he was promoted to the team’s cornerbacks coach after Kevin Curtis left for Baylor.

References

External links
California Golden Bears bio
Indianapolis Colts bio
Washington Redskins bio

1993 births
Living people
African-American players of American football
American football safeties
California Golden Bears football players
Indianapolis Colts players
Washington Redskins players
Detroit Lions players
Oakland Raiders players
21st-century African-American sportspeople